is a 1959 Japanese film directed by Kaneto Shindo. It is based on events involving the fishing vessel Daigo Fukuryū Maru in 1954.

Plot

An ageing fishing boat, Dai-go Fukuryū Maru ("Lucky Dragon No. 5") sets out from the port of Yaizu in Shizuoka Prefecture. It travels around the Pacific, line fishing. While the ship is near Bikini Atoll, the ship's navigator sees a flash. All the crew come up to watch. They realize it is an atomic explosion, but take the time to clear their fishing gear. A short time later, grey ash starts to fall on the ship. By the time the ship returns to port, the sailors have been burned brown. They unload the fish, which are then transported away. They visit the local doctor and then go to Tokyo for an examination. It turns out they are all highly radioactive. Their symptoms become worse, and the contaminated fish causes a panic. The men are taken to hospitals in Tokyo, leaving their families behind. The radio operator, Kuboyama (Jūkichi Uno), dies from the radiation.

Cast
 Jūkichi Uno as Manakichi Kuboyama
 Nobuko Otowa as Shizu Kuboyama
 Harold Conway
 Masao Mishima
 Kikue Mori
 Yasushi Nagata
 Taketoshi Naitō
 Kei Taguchi
 Eitarō Ozawa as Governor
 Koreya Senda as Dr. Kinoshita
 Ippei Sōda
 Taiji Tonoyama

See also
 List of films about nuclear issues

References

External links
 

1959 films
Japanese drama films
1950s Japanese-language films
1959 drama films
Drama films based on actual events
Films directed by Kaneto Shindo
1950s Japanese films